Novo-Uspenka is a rural locality (a khutor) in Uryvskoye Rural Settlement, Ostrogozhsky District, Voronezh Oblast, Russia. The population was 297 as of 2010. There are 2 streets.

Geography 
Novo-Uspenka is located 41 km north of Ostrogozhsk (the district's administrative centre) by road. Mastyugino is the nearest rural locality.

References 

Rural localities in Ostrogozhsky District